Mein Sitara is a 2016  Pakistani television series that aired on TV One. The series was written by Faiza Iftikhar, directed by Seema Tahir Khan, and produced by TV One Productions. It had an ensemble cast of Saba Qamar, Mikaal Zulfiqar, Meera, Hassan Ahmed, Anum Fayyaz, Noman Ijaz, Rashid Farooqui, and others. The serial marked the fourth on-screen collaboration of Saba Qamar and Mikaal Zulfiqar after Pani Jaisa Piyar (2011), Izteraab (2014), and Sangat (2015). Set in the mid-1960s, the drama serial follows the fortunes of characters from Lollywood's golden era and their tremulous journey till the turn of this century.

At the 16th Lux Style Awards, the series received two nominations, best television play and best actress for Qamar.

Plot
It is based on the life and situations of actors and directors of the film industry. Sitara (Saba Qamar)'s character in particular was inspired from one of the most renowned actresses of the film industry. Sitara is a poor girl who makes it big in the industry. The series showed what really goes on behind the scenes and how sometimes actresses have to fight many difficulties at the same time. It is story of friendship, dreams, love, despair, as well as hope. It was an emotional journey which covered 3 decades of the film industry.

Cast
 Saba Qamar as Surraiya/Sitara
 Mikaal Zulfiqar as Farhad Sethi
 Meera as Naseem Dilruba
 Noman Ijaz
 Anum Fayyaz
 Rashid Farooqui
 Hassan Ahmed as Jamal
 Ayesha Gul as Jharna
 Sara Gul
 Rija Ali
 Faiza Ali

Soundtrack

The theme song was composed by Waqar Ali and sung by Rahat Fateh Ali Khan. The lyricist was Khalil Ullah Farooqui and the music video was released in 2016.

Accolades

References

External links
Mein Sitara on Official website

2016 Pakistani television series debuts
2016 Pakistani television series endings
Pakistani drama television series
Pakistani television series
Pakistani romantic drama television series
Urdu-language telenovelas
Pakistani telenovelas
Pakistani period television series
Television series set in the 1960s